Hesychius of Alexandria was a Greek grammarian who, probably in the 5th or 6th century AD, compiled the richest lexicon of unusual and obscure Greek words that has survived, probably by absorbing the works of earlier lexicographers. 

The work, titled "Alphabetical Collection of All Words" (Synagōgē Pasōn Lexeōn kata Stoicheion), includes more than 50,000 entries, a copious list of peculiar words, forms and phrases, with an explanation of their meaning, and often with a reference to the author who used them or to the district of Greece where they were current. Hence, the book is of great value to the student of the Ancient Greek dialects and in the restoration of the text of the classical authors generallyparticularly of such writers as Aeschylus and Theocritus, who used many unusual words. Hesychius is important, not only for Greek philology, but also for studying lost languages and obscure dialects (such as Thracian) and in reconstructing Proto-Indo-European. Many of the words that are included in this work are not found in surviving ancient Greek texts.

Hesychius' explanations of many epithets and phrases also reveal many important facts about the religion and social life of the ancients.

In a prefatory letter Hesychius mentions that his lexicon is based on that of Diogenianus (itself extracted from an earlier work by Pamphilus), but that he has also used similar works by the grammarian Aristarchus of Samothrace, Apion, Heliodorus, Amerias and others.

Hesychius was probably not a Christian. Explanations of words from Gregory Nazianzus and other Christian writers (glossae sacrae) are later interpolations.

The lexicon survives in one deeply corrupt 15th-century manuscript, which is preserved in the library of San Marco at Venice, (Marc. Gr. 622, 15th century).

A modern edition has been published under the auspices of the Royal Danish Academy of Fine Arts in Copenhagen, begun by Kurt Latte (vol. 1 published in 1953, vol. 2 posthumously in 1966) and completed by Peter Allan Hansen and Ian C. Cunningham (vol. 3, 2005, vol. 4, 2009).

References

 Harry Thurston Peck, Harpers Dictionary of Classical Antiquities, 1898.
 Eleanor Dickey, Ancient Greek Scholarship (Oxford 2007) 88-90

External links
 
 The new continuation of Latte's edition: Vol. III (pi through sigma), Vol. IV (tau through omega)
 Hesychii Alexandrini Lexicon, Moritz Schmidt (ed.), Ienae, typis Maukij, 1867.
 Hesychii glossographi discipulus et epiglōssistēs russus in ipsa Constantinopoli, sec. XII-XIII.: e Codice Vindobonensi graecorussica omnia, additus aliis pure graecis, et trium aliorum Cyrilliani lexici codicum speciminibus: aliisque miscellaneis philologici maxime et slavistici argumenti, Bartholomaeus Kopilar (ed.), Vindobonae, 1839, prostat apud G. Gerold.
 Kurt Latte, Ian Campbell Cunningham (ed.), Hesychii Alexandrini lexicon: volumen I: A-Δ. Sammlung griechischer und lateinischer Grammatiker, 11.   Berlin; Boston:  De Gruyter, 2018.  Pp. xxxvii, 660.  .  €169,95. Review by Eleanor Dickey.

5th-century Byzantine people
6th-century Byzantine people
5th-century Egyptian people
6th-century Egyptian people
Ancient Greek grammarians
Ancient Greek lexicographers
Roman-era Alexandrians
Ancient Greek writers
5th-century Byzantine writers
6th-century Byzantine writers
Year of birth unknown
Year of death unknown